McPherson's Purchase is a historic farm complex dating to the 19th century and located near Pomfret, Charles County, Maryland, United States.

It is a working farm encompassing , a majority of which is cleared and under cultivation. Located there is a complex of 18 domestic and agricultural support structures, 11 of which date prior to 1870.  They include two tobacco barns, two wagon or equipment sheds, a corncrib, and a granary, all dating from about 1840–1860, and a former tobacco house built in the late 18th century. Other buildings include a kitchen-service structure, a small garden or storage shed, and a meathouse. A duplex slave quarters with a central chimney is also on the property as well as seven early 20th-century buildings, including a double-pile frame house of simple architectural styling built about 1910. It is significant as a unique representative of a regionally typical 19th-century farmstead.

McPherson's Purchase was listed on the National Register of Historic Places in 1985.

References

External links
, including photo from 1978, at Maryland Historical Trust

Houses in Charles County, Maryland
Houses on the National Register of Historic Places in Maryland
National Register of Historic Places in Charles County, Maryland
Slave cabins and quarters in the United States